Joseph Honoré Kabongo (born 1 January 1985 in Brazzaville) is a former football player from Rwanda.

Career
He began his career by Renaissance Kigali, before joined to Patro Maasmechelen in July 2004. Kabongo left after 6 months Belgium and moved to Sakaryaspor in Turkey in January 2005, he played here 5 games before joined to Hakoah Ramat-Gan in July 2006. Than moved back to APR FC in January 2007, after 1 year in February 2008 left APR and moved to Somalia to sign a contract by Goldogob FC. The Thai club Samut Songkhram FC signed him in July 2008, but for this season of July 2009 he played for Tanzania Champions Young Africans FC.

International
He played from 2005 to 2007 for the Rwanda national football team. Kabongo has also been handed his first cap on 27 March 2005 against Algeria national football team. He was also a member of the Under 17 team from Congo.

External links

References

1985 births
Living people
Rwandan footballers
Rwandan expatriate footballers
Association football forwards
Rwanda international footballers
Sakaryaspor footballers
K. Patro Eisden Maasmechelen players
Hakoah Maccabi Amidar Ramat Gan F.C. players
APR F.C. players
Samutsongkhram F.C. players
Young Africans S.C. players
Belgian Pro League players
Israeli Premier League players
Süper Lig players
Expatriate footballers in Belgium
Expatriate footballers in Turkey
Expatriate footballers in Israel
Expatriate footballers in Tanzania
Expatriate footballers in Thailand
Rwandan expatriate sportspeople in Belgium
Rwandan expatriate sportspeople in Turkey
Rwandan expatriate sportspeople in Israel
Rwandan expatriate sportspeople in Tanzania
Rwandan expatriate sportspeople in Thailand
Tanzanian Premier League players